Ratchet is one of the titular game characters and the main protagonist of the Ratchet & Clank video game series. In the English versions of the games, Ratchet is voiced by Mikey Kelley in the first Ratchet & Clank and by James Arnold Taylor since the second game.

Appearances
Ratchet is an anthropomorphic character known as a Lombax. His first appearance was on Planet Veldin, but it is later revealed in the series that Ratchet was originally born on the Lombax home-world of Planet Fastoon in the Polaris Galaxy and later sent to Planet Veldin in the Solana Galaxy by his father to protect him from Emperor Tachyon. Growing up on Veldin, Ratchet longed to travel to new worlds and even built his own ship.

Shortly after completing his ship, Ratchet met a diminutive robot fugitive whom he dubbed Clank, who helped him to leave Veldin and fulfill his dream of travelling. From this point on, Ratchet and Clank traveled extensively through the Solana, Bogon and Polaris Galaxies, saving them on several occasions.

Ratchet also appears as a playable character in Hot Shots Golf Fore!, Jak X: Combat Racing, PlayStation Move Heroes, PlayStation All-Stars Battle Royale, Mediatonic's Fall Guys and the PlayStation 4 version of Super Bomberman R, and in cameo appearances in Jak II and Astro's Playroom.

Design
Ratchet was originally envisioned by Insomniac Games Vice President of Programming Brian Hastings as a space-traveling reptile alien who would collect various weapons as he progressed through the game; Ratchet's final form was decided upon after Insomniac looked at various terrestrial creatures, such as dogs, rats, and feline features stood out to them because of the sense of agility associated with it. In response to the negative critical reception of Ratchet's design and personality in Ratchet & Clank, Ratchet's personality was altered in Ratchet & Clank: Going Commando to be "less cocky, ...much more friendly to Clank, and... able to handle himself better in stressful situations without being impetuous".

Ratchet tends to be headstrong and is usually not afraid to voice his opinion. During the first game he had a short temper, which he eventually learned to control in later titles. Yet at the same time, Ratchet can be self-conscious and often appears concerned with how people view him as a person. He is also deeply attached to his friends, although at times this relationship can be strained. Following the second game in the series, Ratchet becomes a well-trained commando, with great knowledge of weapons, close-quarters-combat and athletic ability.

Reception
On Mikey Kelley's vocal performance as Ratchet in Ratchet & Clank, Douglass C. Perry of IGN commented that "while Ratchet strives for that perfect dude-like teenager vibe, the voice actor generally hits the mark." Ratchet's in-game model in Ratchet & Clank, particularly his facial animations and fur, was praised by Louis Bedigian of GameZone. Gavin Frankle of Allgame found it hard to form an emotional bond with Ratchet or Clank, saying that Ratchet is "your typical teenager [...] who desires nothing more than excitement and adventure". Benjamin Turner of GameSpy was highly critical of Ratchet in his review of the first game, citing his uninteresting aesthetic design and rude and immoral demeanor as reasons for his ire. Johnny Liu of Game Revolution noted that Ratchet "starts out with a blue-collar attitude, but he's mostly there for deft observations and cutting remarks" and appreciated Ratchet not being "pigeonholed as a typical goody-goody", but concluded that he wasn't very fleshed out.

Critics took note of Ratchet's improved character in subsequent games. Perry commented that Ratchet "is no longer an angry, selfish teenage furry creature from outer space. He's a commando, a little wiser, a little more forgiving and a lot more palatable. Though still furry..." Carlos McElfish of GameZone, describing Ratchet's in the previous game as a "laughably confident, smart-alecky hot-shot", commented that Ratchet's new voice forces a psychological reset in the minds of players. Jeremy Dunham of IGN noted that Ratchet's "Why me?" delivery is "spot on." Ratchet was voted as the sixteenth top character of the 2000s decade by Game Informer'''s readers.

In 2011, readers of Guinness World Records Gamer's Edition'' voted Ratchet as the 15th-top video game character of all time.

References

Fictional explorers in video games
Extraterrestrial characters in video games
Extraterrestrial superheroes
Fictional actors
Fictional space pilots
Fictional felids
Fictional mechanics
Fictional inventors in video games
Male characters in video games
Ratchet & Clank characters

Animal characters in video games

Sony Interactive Entertainment protagonists
Anthropomorphic animal characters
Video game characters introduced in 2002
Video game mascots
Orphan characters in video games
Anthropomorphic video game characters
Fighting game characters
sv:Ratchet & Clank (spelserie)#Ratchet